The Halley's Comet Opal is the largest uncut black opal in the world, according to the Guinness Book of World Records. It is so named because it was unearthed in 1986, a year when Halley's Comet could be seen from Earth. It is the third largest gem grade black opal ever recorded, the largest one extant, and the largest specimen ever found in its region. It was found at Lightning Ridge, New South Wales, Australia by the Lunatic Hill Mining Syndicate. It weighs  (13.99 ounces) and is about the size of a man's fist. Formed about 20 million years ago, it is an example of a nobby, which is a natural lump-shaped opal found only at Lightning Ridge. As of 2006 it was for sale at $1.2 million.

See also 
 List of individual gemstones

Other notable individual opals:
 Andamooka Opal
 Flame Queen Opal
 Galaxy Opal
 Glorious Jubilee
 Olympic Australis Opal

References 

Individual opals